Robert Skov (born 20 May 1996) is a Danish professional footballer who plays for Bundesliga club 1899 Hoffenheim. Born in Spain, he represents the Denmark national team. With 29 goals in the 2018–19 season, he broke the record set by Ebbe Sand for most goals scored in a single Danish Superliga campaign.

Club career

Silkeborg
Skov came up through the youth academy at Silkeborg, making his league debut for the club on 16 May 2013 in a 1–1 home draw with Midtjylland. He came on at 16 years old, as an 81st minute substitute for Jeppe Illum. He scored his first league goal for the club on 19 October 2014 in a 2–1 away defeat to FC Midtjylland. He scored in the 95th minute. Robert Skov played a key role in helping Silkeborg win the Danish 1st Division during the 2013/14 season, despite being only 17 years old. During the 2016–17 Danish Superliga season, Skov helped Silkeborg avoid relegation by becoming their leading scorer, by scoring 10 league goals from his position on the wing.

Copenhagen
In January 2018, Skov completed a move to Copenhagen. The deal cost FC Copenhagen around 7.5 million Danish Kroner. He made his league debut for the club on 10 February 2018 in a 5–1 home victory over Randers, playing all ninety minutes of the match. He scored his first league goal for the club a little over two weeks later, on 25 February 2018 in a 1–0 home victory over Odense BK. He scored in the 61st minute. He scored his first club hat-trick on 2 December 2018 in a 6–1 away victory over Horsens. He scored in the 23rd, 66th, and 90th minutes. Not only did Robert Skov finish as top scorer in the 2018–19 season, but he broke the all time Danish Superliga record by scoring 29 league goals, that was 7 more goals than the second placed scorers in the league. The record was previously held by Ebbe Sand who scored 28 league goals in the 1998 season. Skov was also named Danish Player of the Year for 2018. By March 2019, Skov was rumoured to Tottenham Hotspur and Arsenal after putting in outstanding performances in the Superliga.

Hoffenheim
In July 2019, Skov signed a contract with 1899 Hoffenheim for a transfer fee of €10 million.

Skov scored his first goal for Hoffenheim in a 3–0 Bundesliga win over SC Paderborn on 1 November 2019, opening the scoring with a fierce 25-yard free-kick inside two minutes.

International career
In July 2016, Skov was included in the Denmark squad for the 2016 Summer Olympics. He made substitute appearances in two group-stage matches, against South Africa and Brazil, alongside a substitute appearance against Nigeria in the quarterfinals. During the group stage, he scored the winning goal in Denmark's 1–0 win over South Africa in the 69th minute. That goal scored by Skov, was ultimately the goal that secured Denmark's advance to the quarter finals.

In May 2018 he was named in Denmark's preliminary 35-man squad for the 2018 World Cup in Russia. However, he did not make the final 23.

In March 2019 Skov was selected for the Denmark squad for the UEFA Euro 2020 qualifying tournament. He made his debut on 10 June 2019 in a Euro 2020 qualifier against Georgia, as a starter.

In June 2020, he was included in the national team's bid for 2020 UEFA Euro, where the team unexpectedly reached the semi-finals.
He was able to represent Spain because he was born in Marbella but he chose to represent Denmark instead.

Player profile
Skov is two footed, although his left foot is his main scoring weapon. He is a skilled winger who is renowned for taking on defenders and dribbling past them. He is also well known for scoring many goals and creating numerous assists. He is especially making a name for himself as a free kick specialist, by blasting in goals on a regular basis. So much so that Danish international player Christian Eriksen suggested that Skov would overtake him as being the number one free kick taker for the Danish national team.

Personal life 
Skov's parents moved from Denmark to Spain in 1994 when his father took a job with a bank in Gibraltar, and as a result, Skov was born in Marbella. His family returned to Denmark when he was nine months old.

Career statistics

Club

International goals
As of match played 10 June 2022. Scores and results list Denmark's goal tally first.

Honours
Silkeborg
 Danish 1st Division: 2013–14

Copenhagen
 Danish Superliga: 2018–19

Individual
 Danish Superliga Player of the Year: 2018–19
 Danish Superliga Top Scorer: 2018–19 (29 goals)
 Tipsbladet Player of the Fall: 2018
 Tipsbladet Player of the Spring: 2019
 Copenhagen Player of the Year: 2018–19

References

External links 
 
 

1996 births
Living people
People from Marbella
Sportspeople from the Province of Málaga
Association football forwards
Danish men's footballers
Denmark youth international footballers
Denmark under-21 international footballers
Olympic footballers of Denmark
Denmark international footballers
Silkeborg IF players
F.C. Copenhagen players
TSG 1899 Hoffenheim players
Danish Superliga players
Danish 1st Division players
Bundesliga players
Footballers at the 2016 Summer Olympics
UEFA Euro 2020 players
2022 FIFA World Cup players
Danish expatriate men's footballers
Danish expatriate sportspeople in Germany
Expatriate footballers in Germany
People from Silkeborg
Sportspeople from the Central Denmark Region